George Gill Wills (June 18, 1903 – April 6, 1983) was a Michigan politician.

Political life
The Flint City Commission selected Wills as mayor in 1948 and then selected him again for another year.  In 1961, Wills was a primary election candidate for Michigan state constitutional convention delegate, Genesee County 2nd District.

References

Mayors of Flint, Michigan
1903 births
1983 deaths
20th-century American politicians
Michigan Republicans